The familiar bluet (Enallagma civile) is a damselfly of the family Coenagrionidae, native to much of the United States and southern Canada.

References

 
 Lam, E. (2004) Damselflies of the Northeast. Forest Hills, NY:Biodiversity Books. p. 72.

External links
Familiar bluet Diagnostic reference photographs and information

Coenagrionidae
Odonata of North America
Insects of Canada
Insects of the United States
Fauna of the Eastern United States
Fauna of the Western United States
Insects described in 1861
Taxa named by Hermann August Hagen